Delain Sasa (born March 9, 1979 in Kinshasa) is a football striker from Congo DR. He currently plays for KS Bylis Ballsh in Albania. He previously played in Germany for Bayer Leverkusen and KFC Uerdingen 05, in Turkey for Erzurumspor, and in Albania for KF Partizani Tirana and Flamurtari.

References

External links
 Profile at TFF.org

1979 births
Living people
Footballers from Kinshasa
Democratic Republic of the Congo footballers
Association football forwards
Democratic Republic of the Congo expatriate footballers
Expatriate footballers in Germany
KFC Uerdingen 05 players
Democratic Republic of the Congo expatriate sportspeople in Germany
Bayer 04 Leverkusen II players
Expatriate footballers in Turkey
Erzurumspor footballers
Democratic Republic of the Congo expatriate sportspeople in Turkey
Expatriate footballers in Albania
FK Partizani Tirana players
Democratic Republic of the Congo expatriate sportspeople in Albania
Bonner SC players
Flamurtari Vlorë players
KF Vllaznia Shkodër players
KF Bylis Ballsh players
Expatriate footballers in China
Liaoning F.C. players
Chinese Super League players
2. Bundesliga players
Democratic Republic of the Congo expatriate sportspeople in China
21st-century Democratic Republic of the Congo people